Nasty Nasty (stylized as NASTY NASTY) was a unit composed of ZE:A's Kevin, Nine Muses's Gyeongree and Sojin. It was formed by Star Empire Entertainment in 2014.

History
Star Empire Entertainment began releasing teaser pictures of their first project-unit on August 22 that included Nine Muses member Gyeongree and So Jin and ZE:A member Kevin . The unit was announced to be called Nasty Nasty and debuted on September 3, 2014 with their title track "Knock." On January 11, 2015, Sojin was announced to be joining the new line-up of Nine Muses along with another trainee Keumjo after the departure of three of its members. She made her debut into the group through their single, "Drama", the title track from their third mini-album.

Members
The members of Nasty Nasty were Kevin from ZE:A, and former Nine Muses members Gyeongree and Sojin.

Discography

Charted Songs

References

External links

K-pop music groups
Musical groups established in 2014
South Korean dance music groups
South Korean idol groups
South Korean pop music groups
2014 establishments in South Korea
South Korean co-ed groups